The 2010 presidential campaign of Benigno Aquino III, then Philippine Senator, began when he announced his candidacy for the presidency of the Philippines at the Club Filipino, Greenhills, San Juan, Metro Manila, on September 9, 2009, 40 days after the death of his mother, former President Corazon Aquino. On September 21, 2009, Aquino's campaign announced that Senator Mar Roxas would be his vice presidential nominee.

On June 9, 2010, Aquino was proclaimed by the Congress of the Philippines as President-elect of the Philippines, winning the election with 15,208,678 votes and defeating Former President Joseph Estrada of the Pwersa ng Masang Pilipino and seven other candidates. Roxas, his vice presidential nominee, narrowly lost to Estrada's running mate, Makati Mayor Jejomar Binay. Aquino, the tenth Philippine Senator to be elected president, was sworn in as the 15th President of the Philippines on June 30, 2010, at the Quirino Grandstand in Manila.

Background

Roxas' Candidacy
On November 26, 2008, the Liberal Party elected Mar Roxas, president of the Liberal Party, as the standard-bearer of the Liberal Party for President of the Philippines in the then-upcoming 2010 presidential elections.

Death of President Corazon Aquino
On August 1, 2009, former President Corazon Aquino died from colon cancer. Following her funeral, many people began calling on her son, Benigno Aquino III to run for President of the Philippines. This groundswell of support became known as the "Noynoy Phenomenon".

Noynoy Aquino for President Movement
On August 27, 2009, Edgardo "Eddie" Roces, son of the late Chino Roces, former publisher and owner of the Manila Times, and a group of lawyers and activists formed the Noynoy Aquino for President Movement (NAPM), a nationwide campaign to collect a million signatures in order to persuade Aquino to run for president, reminiscent of Roces' father, who on October 15, 1985, launched the Cory Aquino for President Movement (CAPM), collecting more than one million signatures nationwide, asking Aquino's mother to run against Ferdinand Marcos in the 1986 presidential snap elections.

Press conferences at the Club Filipino
In September 2009, the Liberal Party held numerous press conferences in relation to the 2010 elections at the Club Filipino in Greenhills, San Juan City, the site of the presidential inauguration of Aquino's mother in February 1986.

Roxas withdraws
On September 1, 2009, at the Club Filipino, in a press conference, Senator Mar Roxas, president of the Liberal Party and standard-bearer of the Liberal Party for President of the Philippines, announced his withdrawal from the presidential race and expressed his support for Aquino, as the standard-bearer of the Liberal Party for president. Aquino later stood side by side with Roxas, but did not make a public statement at the press conference.

Aquino accepts the bid for presidency
On September 2, 2009, in a press conference at the Club Filipino, Aquino announced that he would be going on a "spiritual retreat" over the weekend to finalize his decision for the 2010 presidential election, reminiscent of the decision of his mother, who in 1985, went on a retreat before giving her decision to run for the presidency during the snap elections in 1986. Aquino went on a retreat over the weekend, visiting the Carmelite sisters in Zamboanga City.

The following week, on September 9, Aquino officially announced his candidacy for the presidency in the then-upcoming elections.

Aquino-Roxas tandem

On September 21, 2009, Roxas, alongside Aquino, officially announced his candidacy for the vice presidency, as the standard-bearer of the Liberal Party for vice president, launching the Aquino-Roxas tandem. On November 28, 2009, Aquino and Roxas filed their certificate of candidacy for president and vice president respectively.

Opinion Polling
From the time Aquino announced his candidacy for the presidency to Election Day, he had a commanding lead in the opinion polls.

Fake psychiatric reports
During the 90-day election campaign period from February 9–May 8, 2010, fake psychiatric reports on Aquino's mental health began circulating.

According to Aquino, his camp had received information that the first fake psychiatric report on his mental state that was circulated on the Internet came from the wife of Guido Delgado, a supporter of the Nacionalista Party. Aquino noted that the supporter's move was made with "malicious intent".

An unidentified supporter of Senator Manny Villar, president of the Nacionalista Party and the standard bearer of the Nacionalista Party for President of the Philippines, sent a second fake psychiatric report to Villar's volunteer center located at Star Mall in Mandaluyong. The psychiatric report was presented in a restaurant in Quezon City, during a press conference held by Guido Delgado, a supporter of the Nacionalista Party and former president of the National Power Corporation (NAPOCOR). The psychiatric report was supposedly signed by Father Jaime C. Bulatao, S.J., PhD, a Jesuit priest, a professor of Psychology and a clinical psychologist at the Ateneo de Manila University, taken when Aquino was finishing his bachelor's degree in economics at the Ateneo de Manila University in 1979, showed that Aquino suffered from depression and melancholia, however, Father Bulatao had denied writing or signing the psychiatric report.

A fake third psychiatric report on Aquino's mental state was circulated on the Internet. The psychiatric report was supposedly signed by Father Carmelo A. Caluag II, S.J, a Jesuit priest at the Ateneo de Manila University. The psychiatric report showed that Aquino suffered from major depressive disorder, however, Father Caluag had denied having made any psychiatric evaluation of Aquino. The psychiatric report was disowned by the Ateneo de Manila University Psychology Department.

Aquino described the release of another fake psychiatric report as an "act of desperation" of his political opponents to besmirch his reputation. Aquino dismissed his "psychiatric evaluation", saying its release only showed how desperate his rivals were.

Aquino-Binay (NoyBi)

During the ninety-day election campaign period, Senator Francis Escudero began endorsing Aquino as President of the Philippines, and Jejomar Binay, the standard-bearer of PDP-Laban for vice president, as Vice President of the Philippines, launching the Aquino-Binay campaign. However, this was done without the consent of the two candidates, since Escudero, Aquino and Binay came from different political parties. Aquino had Mar Roxas as his running mate for vice president, while Binay was former President Joseph Estrada's running mate for vice president. The Aquino-Binay campaign endorsed by Escudero was successful as the Congress of the Philippines proclaimed Aquino and Binay the winners of the 2010 elections for president and vice president on June 9, 2010.

Election Day & Proclamation by Congress
During the 2010 presidential election, held on May 10, 2010, in unofficial tallies, conducted by the Commission on Elections (COMELEC) and the Parish Pastoral Council for Responsible Voting (PPCRV), Aquino was the leading candidate in tallied votes for president, and in the official Congressional canvass, Aquino was the leading candidate in canvassed votes for president. Aquino was unofficially being referred to as "President-apparent" by the media.

On June 9, 2010, at the Batasang Pambansa, in Quezon City, the Congress of the Philippines proclaimed Aquino as the President-elect of the Philippines, following the 2010 election with 15,208,678 votes, while Jejomar Binay, the former mayor of Makati, was proclaimed as the Vice President-elect of the Philippines with 14,645,574 votes, defeating runner-up for the vice presidency Mar Roxas, the standard-bearer of the Liberal Party for vice president.

Notes

References

External links
 Official website
 Official Facebook Page

Benigno Aquino III
2010 Philippine presidential election
Election campaigns in the Philippines